Nightbitch is a 2021 novel by American writer Rachel Yoder. The book is a magical realism style story of a stay-at-home mom who sometimes transforms into a dog.

Writing and composition
Yoder had not written for two years when she began writing Nightbitch. She wrote it in part due to the anger she felt after becoming a mother and the resultant changes to her personal and professional life. She was further inspired by a passage in Jenny Offill's novel Dept. of Speculation. Yoder wrote the novel free of concerns about its strangeness, as she wrote it "for herself". Though, she did have concerns that the book's premise would not provide enough substance for a book of the length she wanted to write.

Critical reception
The novel received positive reviews. In a review for The Seattle Times, Jordan Snowden praised the novel as "[...] a stunning modern feminist fable that shouldn’t be missed". In her review of the book for The Guardian, Lara Feigel referred it as "an important contribution to the engagement with motherhood that rightly dominates contemporary feminism". Writing for The Washington Post, Bethanne Patrick describes how "Rachel Yoder’s debut novel, 'Nightbitch,' may feel as if the author stuck her hand into your brain and rummaged around. Yoder has a powerful understanding of the alienation that can set in for stay-at-home mothers and others." In her review for The New Yorker, Hillary Kelly wrote, "The two predominant strains of maternal commentary in the twenty-first century can be summarized as 'Mothers cannot possibly do all that is asked of them' and 'Mothers are capable of anything.' Each affirms the other: mothers simultaneously cannot live up to both maxims, and they have little choice but to try...Yoder believes both, and neither, and her novel happily occupies a floating realm between them." Slate's Rebecca Onion had mixed feelings about the novel, noting "There are parts of the book that seem to be trying too hard—I could do without the subplot where the narrator reads a mysterious book about magical women and sends long letters to its author. But as a meditation on the radical evolution parenthood demands, it’s perfect."

Film adaptation

Annapurna Pictures and Searchlight Pictures are producing a film adaptation of the novel starring Amy Adams with Marielle Heller directing.

References

 

2021 American novels
Doubleday (publisher) books
American novels adapted into films
Novels about dogs